The Duchy of Daya Luhur or Duchy of Dayeuhluhur is a small kingdom or the duchy which is located in  Dayeuhluhur now covering the western part of Cilacap Regency. The Grand Duchy of Dayeuhluhur was the predecessor to the Cilacap Regency itself.

History

According to ancient history, in the 1456 book of Kedayeuhluhuran History, the Grand Duchy Dayeuhluhur, is an empire free governed by a monarch who Salangkuning located at the palace. The Pasirluhur and Dayeuhluhur is a fragment of the kingdom. The first king who consolidated is known as Gagak Ngampar or Banyak Ngampar who is the brother of Bayak Cotro from Karanglewas Pasirluhur of the Kingdom, Purwokerto. Both of them are the sons of the royal Prabu Siliwangi Pajajaran of the Kingdom.

Economy

Mountain Farming is the backbone of Dayeuhluhur economy.

Demographics

It has a population of around 52,000 people who speak Sundanese language and works as farmers.

Central Java
 
Dayeuhluhur